Hoppegarten (Mark) (simply known as Hoppegarten) is a railway station located in Hoppegarten, in the Märkisch-Oderland district of Brandenburg. It is served by the S-Bahn line .

During peak hours, every 2nd train terminates at this station.

References

Berlin S-Bahn stations
Railway stations in Brandenburg
Buildings and structures in Märkisch-Oderland
Railway stations in Germany opened in 1870